This article presents the heads of the military departments of the Russian Provisional Government (Russian Republic), the Russian SFSR, the Soviet Union and the Russian Federation.

Provisional Government (1917)

Russian Soviet Federative Socialist Republic (1917–1922)

Union of Soviet Socialist Republics (1922–1991)

Russian Federation (1991–present)

See also 
 List of heads of the military of Imperial Russia

References 

Military ministers
Defence ministers of Russia
Naval ministers